Aleksandr Aleksandrovich Razborov (born February 16, 1963), sometimes known as Sasha Razborov, is a Soviet and Russian mathematician and computational theorist. He is Andrew McLeish Distinguished Service Professor at the University of Chicago.

Research 
In his best known work, joint with Steven Rudich, he introduced the notion of natural proofs, a class of strategies used to prove fundamental lower bounds in computational complexity. In particular, Razborov and Rudich showed that, under the assumption that certain kinds of one-way functions exist, such proofs cannot give a resolution of the P = NP problem, so new techniques will be required in order to solve this question.

Awards 
 Nevanlinna Prize (1990) for introducing the "approximation method" in proving Boolean circuit lower bounds of some essential algorithmic problems,
  Erdős Lecturer, Hebrew University of Jerusalem, 1998.
  Corresponding member of the Russian Academy of Sciences (2000)
 Gödel Prize (2007, with Steven Rudich) for the paper "Natural Proofs."
 David P. Robbins Prize for the paper "On the minimal density of triangles in graphs" (Combinatorics, Probability and Computing 17 (2008), no. 4, 603–618), and for introducing a new powerful method, flag algebras, to solve problems in extremal combinatorics
 Gödel Lecturer (2010) with the lecture titled Complexity of Propositional Proofs.
 Andrew MacLeish Distinguished Service Professor (2008) in the Department of Computer Science, University of Chicago.
 Fellow of the American Academy of Arts and Sciences (AAAS) (2020).

Bibliography 

 (PhD thesis. 32.56MB)

 (Survey paper for  JACM's 50th anniversary)

See also 
Avi Wigderson
Circuit complexity
Free group
Natural proofs
One-way function
Pseudorandom function family
Resolution (logic)

Notes

External links 
.
Alexander Razborov's Home Page.
All-Russian Mathematical Portal: Persons: Razborov Alexander Alexandrovich.
Biography sketch in the Toyota Technological Institute at Chicago.
Curricula Vitae at the Department of Computer Science, University of Chicago.
DBLP: Alexander A. Razborov.

MathSciNet: "Items authored by Razborov, A. A."
The Work of A.A. Razborov – an article by László Lovász in the Proceedings of the International Congress of Mathematicians, Kyoto, Japan, 1990.

1963 births
20th-century Russian mathematicians
21st-century Russian mathematicians
Gödel Prize laureates
Nevanlinna Prize laureates
Living people
Corresponding Members of the Russian Academy of Sciences
Moscow State University alumni
Russian computer scientists
Soviet computer scientists
Soviet mathematicians
Theoretical computer scientists
International Mathematical Olympiad participants
Tarski lecturers
Fellows of the American Academy of Arts and Sciences
Gödel Lecturers